Events from the year 1922 in Japan. It corresponds to Taishō 11 (大正11年) in the Japanese calendar.

Incumbents
Emperor: Taishō
Regent: Hirohito
Prime Minister:
Takahashi Korekiyo (until June 12)
Katō Tomosaburō (from June 12)

Governors
Aichi Prefecture: Hikoji Kawaguchi 
Akita Prefecture: Ryoshin Nao (until 16 October); Masao Kishimoto (starting 16 October)
Aomori Prefecture: Yujiro Ozaki 
Ehime Prefecture: Juunosuke Miyazaki 
Fukui Prefecture: Josuke Shiraogawa 
Fukushima Prefecture: 
 until 14 June: Miyata Mitsuo
 14 June-16 October: Toshio Mawatari
 starting 16 October: Iwata Mamoru 
Gifu Prefecture: Manpei Ueda 
Gunma Prefecture: Muneyoshi Oshiba (until 16 October); Yamaoka Kunitoshi (starting 16 October)
Hiroshima Prefecture: Ichiro Yoda (until 16 October); Kamehiko Abe (starting 16 October)
Ibaraki Prefecture: Genjiro Moriya 
Iwate Prefecture: Takeo Kakinuma (until 16 October); Ushidzuka Torataro (starting 16 October)
Kagawa Prefecture: Yoshibumi Satake (until 24 October); Shuji Sasaki (starting 24 October)
Kanagawa Prefecture: Yasukouchi Asakichi (starting month unknown)
Kochi Prefecture: Abe Yoshihiko (until 16 October); Toyoji Obata (starting 16 October)
Kumamoto Prefecture: Sansuke Nakayama (until 16 October); Tadahiko Okada (starting 16 October)
Kyoto Prefecture: Raizo Wakabayashi (until October); Tokikazu Ikematsu (starting October)
Mie Prefecture: Haruki Yamawaki (until 16 October); Saburo Shibata (starting 16 October)
Miyagi Prefecture: Yuichiro Chikaraishi 
Miyazaki Prefecture: Goro Sugiyama (until 16 October); Muneyoshi Oshiba (starting 16 October)
Nagano Prefecture: Toshio Honma
Niigata Prefecture: Ota Masahiro 
Okayama Prefecture: Masao Kishimoto
Okinawa Prefecture: Jyun Wada 
Saga Prefecture: Tominaga 
Saitama Prefecture: Horiuchi Hidetaro 
Shiname Prefecture: Sanehide Takarabe 
Tochigi Prefecture: Hiroyoshi Hiratsuka (until 16 October); Haruki Yamawaki (starting 16 October)
Tokyo: Katsuo Usami 
Toyama Prefecture: Shida Jisho (until 26 September); Kihachiro Ito (starting 26 September)
Yamagata Prefecture: Morimoto Izumi (until 16 October); Agata Shinobu (starting 16 October)
Yamanashi Prefecture: Miki Nagano (until month unknown)

Events
February 3 – According to Railway Ministry of Japan official confirmed report, A surface avalanche hit a passenger train near by Katsuyama shelter in Utatonami (now Itoigawa), Niigata Prefecture. There were 90 fatalities and 40 people were hurt.
February 6 – Washington Naval Treaty signed between the United States, United Kingdom, Japan, France and Italy. Japan returns some of its control over the Shandong Peninsula to China.
February 11 – Ezaki Glico was founded.
May 1 – Kinjōtei Bakery, as predecessor of Fuji Bakery was founded in Nagoya.
July – Shinano River incident
August 8 – Shogakukan was founded.
August 28 – Japan withdrew troops from the Siberian Intervention

Births
January 4 – Futaro Yamada, author (d. 2001)
February 20 – Hitoshi Motoshima, mayor of Nagasaki (d. 2014)
March 8 – Mizuki Shigeru, manga author and historian (d. 2015)
March 20 – Terada Kiyoyuki, aikido teacher (d. 2009)
April 25 – Ayako Miura, novelist (d. 1999)
May 15 – Jakucho Setouchi, Buddhist nun, writer and activist
June 18 – Donald Keene, scholar, historian, and translator (d. 2019)
August 27 – Sōsuke Uno, Prime Minister of Japan (d. 1998)
September 16 – Kenichi Yamamoto, mechanical engineer and business executive (d. 2017)
October 14 – Yumeji Tsukioka, film actress (d. 2017)

Deaths
January 10 – Ōkuma Shigenobu, politician and Prime Minister of Japan (b. 1838)
February 1 – Yamagata Aritomo, field marshal and Prime Minister of Japan (b. 1838)
February 8 – Kabayama Sukenori, samurai, military leader and politician (b. 1837)
June 20 – Aeba Koson, author, theater critic, and calligraphy master (b. 1855)
June 27 – Prince Higashifushimi Yorihito, marshal admiral (b. 1867)
July 8 – Mori Ōgai, novelist, poet, translator and army surgeon (b. 1862)
July 22 – Takamine Jōkichi, chemist (b. 1854)
September 18 – Yukie Chiri, Ainu transcriber and translator (b. 1903)

See also
List of Japanese films of the 1920s

References

 
1920s in Japan
Years of the 20th century in Japan